Polioptila is a genus of small insectivorous birds in the family Polioptilidae. They are found in North and South America.

The genus Polioptila was introduced by the English zoologist Philip Sclater in 1855. Although he listed several members, he did not specify a type species.  This was designated by the American ornithologist Spencer Baird in 1864 as Montacilla caerulea, Linnaeus, now the blue-grey gnatcatcher, Polioptila caerulea. The name of the genus combines the Ancient Greek words πολιος polios "grey" and πτιλον  "plumage".

The genus contains 17 species:
 Rio Negro gnatcatcher, Polioptila facilis – split from P. guianensis
 Guianan gnatcatcher, Polioptila guianensis
 Slate-throated gnatcatcher, Polioptila schistaceigula
 Para gnatcatcher, Polioptila paraensis – split from P. guianensis
 Iquitos gnatcatcher, Polioptila clementsi – described in 2005
 Inambari gnatcatcher, Polioptila attenboroughi – described in 2013
 Tropical gnatcatcher, Polioptila plumbea
 Creamy-bellied gnatcatcher, Polioptila lactea
 Masked gnatcatcher, Polioptila dumicola
 Cuban gnatcatcher, Polioptila lembeyei
 Yucatan gnatcatcher, Polioptila albiventris
 White-browed gnatcatcher, Polioptila bilineata – split from P. plumbea
 Blue-grey gnatcatcher, Polioptila caerulea
 Black-tailed gnatcatcher, Polioptila melanura
 California gnatcatcher, Polioptila californica
 Black-capped gnatcatcher, Polioptila nigriceps
 White-lored gnatcatcher, Polioptila albiloris

References

 
Polioptilidae
Bird genera
Taxa named by Philip Sclater
Taxonomy articles created by Polbot